Patrick J. Kirwan (13 November 1899 – 1 September 1963) was an Irish Gaelic footballer. His championship career at senior level with the Dublin county team lasted two seasons from 1923 until 1924.

Kirwan joined the Dublin senior team during the 1923 championship. Over the course of the next two seasons he enjoyed much success and won an All-Ireland medal in 1923. He also won back-to-back Leinster medals.

Honours

Dublin
All-Ireland Senior Football Championship (1): 1923
Leinster Senior Football Championship (2): 1923, 1924

References

1899 births
1963 deaths
Dublin inter-county Gaelic footballers
Garda Gaelic footballers
Garda Síochána officers
People from County Cavan